Jacob Ryan Lamb (born October 9, 1990) is an American professional baseball infielder in the Los Angeles Angels organization. He made his MLB debut with the Arizona Diamondbacks in 2014, and was an All-Star in 2017. He has also played in MLB for the Oakland Athletics, Chicago White Sox, Toronto Blue Jays, Los Angeles Dodgers, and Seattle Mariners.

Amateur career
Lamb grew up in the Queen Anne neighborhood of Seattle, Washington. He attended Bishop Blanchet High School in Seattle and starred for their baseball team.

After graduating high school, the Pittsburgh Pirates selected Lamb in the 38th round of the 2009 MLB Draft, but he followed through with his commitment to attend the University of Washington. He played college baseball for the Washington Huskies baseball team. With the Huskies, Lamb was named an All-Pac-12 Conference player. After his sophomore season in 2011, he played collegiate summer baseball for the Yarmouth–Dennis Red Sox of the Cape Cod Baseball League.

Professional career

Arizona Diamondbacks (2014–2020)

The Arizona Diamondbacks selected Lamb in the sixth round of the 2012 MLB Draft. He made his professional debut in 2012 for the Missoula Osprey of the Rookie-level Pioneer League. Lamb played for the Visalia Rawhide of the Class A-Advanced California League in 2013, but appeared in only 64 games due to a hamstring injury. The Diamondbacks assigned Lamb to the Arizona Fall League after the 2013 season. They invited him to spring training in 2014. He began the 2014 season with the Mobile Bay Bears of the Class AA Southern League, and was promoted to the Reno Aces of the Class AAA Pacific Coast League.

After the Diamondbacks traded Martín Prado on July 31, they promoted Lamb to the major leagues on August 7. In 37 games that season, Lamb had a .230 batting average with four home runs. He began the 2015 season on the disabled list but was later taken out and played in 107 games, hitting .263 with six home runs and 34 runs batted in (RBIs). During the 2016 season, he hit .291 with 20 home runs and 61 RBIs in the first half, and was a finalist for the last All Star spot in the All-Star Final Vote. After struggling in the second half, in which he hit .197 (46-for-234), Lamb finished the season with a .249 average, 29 home runs, 91 RBIs, and nine triples.

Lamb was selected to play in the 2017 MLB All-Star Game. He finished the season hitting .248 with 30 home runs, 105 RBIs and 87 walks, although he managed more consistent splits (.246 in the first half and .250 in the second half). On August 2, 2018, he was ruled out for the season as he underwent season-ending shoulder surgery. In 56 games, he hit .222 with six home runs and 31 RBIs.

On April 5, 2019, Lamb went on the injured list with a Grade 2 strain to his left quadriceps muscle. He returned to the Diamondbacks in late June. He batted .193 for the 2019 season.

Lamb and the Diamondbacks agreed to a $5.5 million salary for the 2020 season. On September 10, 2020, the Diamondbacks designated Lamb for assignment. At the time of his designation, he had hit .116/.240/.210 with no home runs over 50 plate appearances in 2020. Lamb was released on September 12.

Oakland Athletics (2020)
On September 14, 2020, Lamb signed a major league contract with the Oakland Athletics and was added to their active roster. In 13 games for Oakland as Matt Chapman's replacement after he underwent surgery, Lamb slashed .267/.327/.556 with three home runs and nine RBIs and 45 at-bats.

Atlanta Braves (2021)
On February 21, 2021, Lamb agreed to a major league contract with the Atlanta Braves for $1 million. On March 27, 2021, the Braves released Lamb due to his underwhelming performance during spring training.

Chicago White Sox (2021)
On March 30, 2021, Lamb agreed to a contract with the Chicago White Sox. He appeared in 43 games, batting .212/.321/.389 with 6 home runs and 13 RBIs, before he was designated for assignment on September 1, 2021.

Toronto Blue Jays (2021)
On September 3, 2021, Lamb was claimed off waivers by the Toronto Blue Jays. Lamb was designated for assignment by the Blue Jays following Breyvic Valera's return from the COVID-19 related injured list. Lamb was released by Toronto on September 29.

Los Angeles Dodgers (2022)
On March 14, 2022, Lamb signed a minor league contract with the Los Angeles Dodgers. He was assigned to the Triple-A Oklahoma City Dodgers, where he hit .290 in 61 games with 15 home runs. On June 28, he was called up to the majors. He played in 25 games for the Dodgers, hitting .239 with 2 home runs and 4 RBI's.

Seattle Mariners (2022)
On August 2, 2022, Lamb was traded to the Seattle Mariners in exchange for cash considerations. On September 21, Lamb was designated for assignment and became a free agent on September 24.

Los Angeles Angels
On December 21, 2022, Lamb signed a minor league contract with the Los Angeles Angels.

Personal life
Lamb's father, John, played college football for Whitworth University, and his mother, Deonne, was a tennis player in high school and college. Lamb's older brother, Dan, played two sports in high school. His younger brother, Dylan, plays college baseball for the Washington Huskies. His sister, Megan, played softball after surviving leukemia.

References

External links

Jake Lamb – Washington Huskies

1990 births
Living people
Arizona Diamondbacks players
Arizona League Diamondbacks players
Baseball players from Seattle
Bishop Blanchet High School alumni
Chicago White Sox players
Los Angeles Dodgers players
Major League Baseball first basemen
Major League Baseball third basemen
Missoula Osprey players
Mobile BayBears players
National League All-Stars
Oakland Athletics players
Oklahoma City Dodgers players
Reno Aces players
Salt River Rafters players
Seattle Mariners players
Toronto Blue Jays players
Visalia Rawhide players
Washington Huskies baseball players
Yarmouth–Dennis Red Sox players